Johanna Maria Saarinen (born 8 September 1973) is a Finnish biathlete. She competed in two events at the 1992 Winter Olympics.

References

External links
 

1973 births
Living people
Biathletes at the 1992 Winter Olympics
Finnish female biathletes
Olympic biathletes of Finland
Place of birth missing (living people)